Oppland County Municipality was the regional governing administration of the old Oppland county in Norway. The county municipality was established in its most recent form on 1 January 1976 when the law was changed to allow elected county councils in Norway. The county municipality was dissolved on 1 January 2020, when Oppland was merged with the neighboring Hedmark county, creating the new Innlandet county which is led by the Innlandet County Municipality. The administrative seat is located in Lillehammer and the county mayor was Even Aleksander Hagen.

The main responsibilities of the county municipality included the running of the 13 upper secondary schools. It managed all the county roadways, public transport, dental care, culture, and cultural heritage sites in the county. Public transport was managed through Opplandstrafikk.

Schools
The county municipality ran the following schools (prior to the merger with Hedmark in 2020):

 Dokka Upper Secondary School
 Gausdal Upper Secondary School
 Gjøvik Upper Secondary School
 Hadeland Upper Secondary School
 Lena Upper Secondary School
 Lillehammer Upper Secondary School
 Mesna Upper Secondary School
 Nord-Gudbrandsdal Upper Secondary School
 Raufoss Upper Secondary School
 Valdres Upper Secondary School
 Valle Upper Secondary School
 Vargstad Upper Secondary School
 Vinstra Upper Secondary School

County government
The Oppland county council was made up of 37 representatives that were elected every four years. The council essentially acted as a Parliament or legislative body for the county and it met several times each year. The council was divided into standing committees and an executive board which met considerably more often. Both the council and executive board were led by the County Mayor who held the executive powers of the county. The final County Mayor was Even Aleksander Hagen.

County council
The party breakdown of the council is as follows:

References

 
County municipality
County municipalities of Norway
Organisations based in Lillehammer
1838 establishments in Norway
2020 disestablishments in Norway